A Tribute to Courage monument is a statue of Sam Houston located in Huntsville, Texas (where Sam Houston lived and died), which is 65 miles north of the city of Houston (named in his honor). Sam Houston is one of the founding fathers of Texas. He led the army of Texas during their War for Independence from Mexico in 1836, including the victory at San Jacinto (about 100 miles from the statue) where Texas won her independence by defeating Mexican President Santa Ana in the field. The statue by sculptor David Adickes is 67 feet tall and was built in 1994. It is clearly visible to motorists heading north on Interstate 45. It is the ninth-tallest statue in the United States. It was vandalized with graffiti in March 2008.

References

External links

Giant Statue of Sam Houston

Monuments and memorials in Texas
Outdoor sculptures in Texas
Buildings and structures in Walker County, Texas
Colossal statues in the United States
1994 sculptures
Concrete sculptures in Texas
1994 establishments in Texas
Huntsville, Texas
Statues of Sam Houston
Vandalized works of art in Texas